Jean Louis Conneau (8 Feb 1880 Lodève, Hérault – 5 August 1937, Lodève), better known under the pseudonym André Beaumont, was a pioneer French aviator, Naval Lieutenant and Flying boat manufacturer.

Flying career
Conneau used the pseudonym "Beaumont" because, as a serving member of the French armed forces, he was not permitted to use his own name. He earned his French pilot's license on 7 December 1910 (#322), and his military pilot's license on 18 December 1911 (#4).

Air races

In 1911 he won three of the toughest aeronautical tests: the 'Paris-Rome' race, the first Circuit d'Europe (Tour of Europe) (Paris-Liege-Spa-Utrecht-Brussels-Calais-London-Calais-Paris) on 7 July 1911, and the Daily Mail Circuit of Britain Race (England and Scotland) on 26 July 1911, flying a Blériot XI.  He also participated in the ill-fated 1911 Paris to Madrid air race in May the same year.

During the Paris-Liege leg of the 'Circuit d'Europe' his support engineer and teammate Léon Lemartin was involved in a fatal accident on take-off.

Aircraft manufacture

IN 1912 he became the Technical Director of Donnet-Lévèque who manufactured flying boats. In 1913 he co-founded the Franco-British Aviation (FBA) to build flying boats (Fr. Hydravions (Hydroplanes)). It had its headquarters in London and a factory in Paris and supplied both the French and British armed services.

As a flying boat pilot, during the World War I he commanded squadrons at Nice, Bizerte, Dunkirk, and Venice. He worked at Franco-British Aviation perfecting flying boats for the French Navy from 1915 until 1919.

Publications

Mes trois grandes courses, (My three major races) Hachette, Paris, 1912.

References

External links

 The Great 1911 Air Race visits Whipton( Whipton, a stopping point for the contestants in the 1911 Circuit of Britain race)

1880 births
1937 deaths
French aviators
Aviation history of France
Aviation pioneers
Members of the Early Birds of Aviation
People from Lodève